Morris County is the name of several counties in the United States:

 Morris County, Kansas 
 Morris County, New Jersey, the most populous in the country with the name
 Morris County, Texas